Colegio La República is a Chilean high school located in Rancagua, Cachapoal Province, Chile.

As of 2012, the principal of Colegio La República is Juan Antonio Gutiérrez Espinoza. In that school year, La República had 713 students. The president of the parents' center (centro de padres y apoderados) is Roberto Torres, and in its 2010–2011 term, the president of the students' center (centro de alumnos) is Javiera Garrido Mella.

References

External links
 Colegio La República website 

Educational institutions with year of establishment missing
Secondary schools in Chile
Schools in Cachapoal Province